The 1907–08 British Home Championship was an annual football competition played between the British Home Nations during the second half of the 1907–08 season. England and Scotland shared the title, having each beaten Wales and Ireland in their opening matches before drawing 1–1 with each other in the final game.

England began the strongest side, although all four teams played well in their opening games, both Ireland and Wales running their opponents close. In the second matches however, England and Scotland's quality told, as England beat Wales 7–1 in Wrexham and Ireland succumbed 5–0 in Dublin. In the final matches Ireland and Wales, playing for pride both fought hard, with Ireland clinching a 1–0 win while England and Scotland were unable to break the deadlock and so drew the game and competition, as goal difference was not at this stage used to differentiate teams.

England followed this tournament by becoming the first Home Nation to play a non-British nation with a tour of Central Europe, playing against Austria twice Hungary and Bohemia. In October the England amateur team followed this by winning gold in the football tournament at the 1908 Olympics, held in London.

Table

Results

Winning squads

References

British
1908 in British sport
Brit
Brit
1907–08 in English football
1907–08 in Scottish football
1907-08